is a railway station located in the city of Yokkaichi, Mie Prefecture, Japan, operated by Central Japan Railway Company (JR Tōkai). It also has a freight terminal of the Japan Freight Railway Company (JR Freight). Downtown Yokkaichi is located about 1 km from the station, which is less convenient than the centrally located Kintetsu Yokkaichi Station.

Lines
Yokkaichi Station is served by the Kansai Main Line, and is 37.2 rail kilometers from the terminus of the line at Nagoya Station. Trains on the Ise Railway Ise Line also terminate at this station, although the official terminal station for the line is at Kawarada Station.

Station layout
The station consists of  one, very wide, complex island platform, serving three tracks. The Kansai Main Line uses the outer edges of the island platform, and the Ise Railway uses an indention in one side of the platform, which forms a single bay platform.

Platform

Adjacent stations

History
Yokkaichi Station opened on December 25, 1890, as a station on the Kansai Railway. The Kansai Railway was nationalized on October 1, 1907, and the station became part of the Japanese Government Railways (JGR) system. A new station building was completed on November 3, 1913. The Ise Line began operations from March 1, 1922. JGR became the Japanese National Railways (JNR) after World War II. The station was absorbed into the JR Central network upon the privatization of JNR on April 1, 1987. A new station building was completed in 2012.

Station numbering was introduced to the section of the Kansai Main Line operated JR Central in March 2018; Yokkaichi Station was assigned station number CI11.

Passenger statistics
In fiscal 2019, the station was used by an average of 2286 passengers daily (boarding passengers only).

Surrounding area
Yokkaichi City Hall
Yokkaichi Public Employment Security Office
Yokkaichi Post Office
Yokkaichi Municipal Central Elementary School

See also
 List of railway stations in Japan

References

External links

JR Central station information 

Railway stations in Japan opened in 1890
Railway stations in Mie Prefecture
Stations of Japan Freight Railway Company
Yokkaichi